Frederick III "the restless" of Brunswick-Göttingen-Calenberg (born: 1424; died: 5 March 1495 in Hann. Münden), was a son of Duke William the Victorious of Brunswick-Lüneburg and Cecilia of Brandenburg.  He became Duke of Brunswick-Lüneburg together with his brother William IV in 1482.  However, he was deposed in 1484.

Life 
Frederick was often involved in feuds, raids and highway robberies in its first decades of his life; his was later nicknamed the Restless or Turbulentus because of this. In 1477 he was sent to Geldern to attend to administrative matters. Two years later, in 1479, he had to return home; the reason was probably a mental deficiency or mental illness. A little later he had apparently recovered and was again able to conduct administrative business. After the death of his father, William the Elder in 1482, Frederick and his brother William the Younger ruled Brunswick-Lüneburg jointly. Frederick, however, demanded that the territory be divided. Frederick's share included the Principality of Calenberg.

In 1482, the so-called Great Feud of Hildesheim began, between the City of Hildesheim and its bishop, Berthold II of Landsberg.  The bishop wanted to introduce a new episcopal tax, which the city refused to agree to.  The brothers were on different sides in this feud: William concluded in February 1484 an alliance with the bishop, mediated by his councilor Heinrich von Hardenberg (d. 1492 or 1493), whereas Frederick became Protector of the City of Hildesheim on 7 September 1483.  A year later, in September 1484, armed conflict broke out between the parties.  William took his brother Frederick prisoner on 10 December 1484 and brought him via Gandersheim and Hardegen to Hann. Münden.  Different sources give different reasons for the captivity: some sources — and William himself — mention a new outbreak of mental illness, others point to William's dislike of the division of the country.

The Great Feud of Hildesheim ended in 1486 with an agreement.

A folk song which was discovered in the early 1990s, entitled Duke Frederick, which refers to the circumstances of Frederick's arrest.  It consists of eight stanzas and is written in a Low German dialect, apparently at the time of Hildesheim Feud.  The song laments the alleged injustice that had befallen Frederick.  Some of the conspirators were so opposed to Frederick's stance in the feud that they plotted to overthrow him.  To what extent the song has blended historical facts, half-truths and fiction is, of course, impossible to ascertain.  However, the literature suggests that considerable truth might be hidden in the text.  Among the persons mentioned in the fifth verse are the duke's councilors Otto von der Malsburg (died: probably 1504) and Heinrich von Hardenberg, as well as the Duke's chancellor Johannes Sibolle (attested: 1474-1498), who played an important role on the Brunswick side in the feud.  They may have advised the capture of Frederick in order to extend their influence over the three principalities of Brunswick, Göttingen and Calenberg.

Frederick remained in captivity until his death.  He died on 5 March 1495 in Hann. Munden, where he lies buried.

Marriages 
Frederick was married twice:
 with Anna of Brunswick-Grubenhagen-Einbeck (1415-1474), daughter of the Duke Eric I of Brunswick-Grubenhagen and widow of Albert III of Bavaria
 on 10 May 1483 with Margaret, daughter of Conrad V of Rietberg

Both marriages remained childless.

Ancestors

References 
 Dieter Lent: Ein unbekanntes historisches Volkslied auf die Gefangennahme Herzog Friedrich des Unruhigen von Braunschweig auf Schloß Calenberg im Jahr 1484, in: Braunschweigisches Jahrbuch für Landesgeschichte, Braunschweigischer Geschichtsverein, Brunswick, 1993, vol. 74, pp. 9–25 (especially pp. 15–19: Overview of Frederick's biography)
 Wilhelm Havemann: Beiträge zur Lebensgeschichte von Herzog Friedrich dem Jüngeren, in: Vaterländisches Archiv des Historischen Vereins für Niedersachsen, Historischer Verein für Niedersachsen, Hannover, 1841, pp. 176–221, Online
 
 
 
 Joachim Lehrmann: Raubritter zwischen Heide, Harz und Weser, Lehrte, 2007,

External links 
 Genealogy of the House of Guelph (Brunswick line)

Footnotes 

Princes of Calenberg
1424 births
1495 deaths
15th-century German people
Middle House of Brunswick

fr:Frédéric II de Brunswick-Lunebourg